The 1989–90 NBA season was the Detroit Pistons' 42nd season in the National Basketball Association, and 33rd season in the city of Detroit. The team played at the Palace of Auburn Hills in suburban Auburn Hills, Michigan. As the defending champions, the Pistons had another successful season winning 13 consecutive games around January and February, holding a 35–14 record at the All-Star break, then posting a 12-game winning streak in March, as they finished first place in the Eastern Conference with a 59–23 record.

Isiah Thomas led the team with 18.4 points, 9.4 assists and 1.7 steals per game, while last year's Finals MVP Joe Dumars averaged 17.8 points and 4.9 assists per game, and was named to the All-NBA Third Team, and Dennis Rodman provided the team with 8.8 points and 9.7 rebounds per game, and was named Defensive Player of the Year. In addition, James Edwards provided with 14.5 points per game, while Mark Aguirre contributed 14.1 points per game, and Bill Laimbeer averaged 12.1 points and 9.6 rebounds per game. Off the bench, Vinnie Johnson contributed 9.8 points per game, and John Salley led the team with 1.9 blocks per game. Thomas, Dumars and Rodman were all selected for the 1990 NBA All-Star Game, with head coach Chuck Daly coaching the Eastern Conference. Dumars and Rodman were both named to the NBA All-Defensive First Team.

In the Eastern Conference First Round of the playoffs, the Pistons swept the Indiana Pacers in three straight games, then defeated the 5th-seeded New York Knicks four games to one in the Eastern Conference Semi-finals. In the Eastern Conference Finals, the Pistons defeated the Chicago Bulls in seven games to advance to the NBA Finals for the third straight year.

In the Finals, the Pistons faced the Portland Trail Blazers, who were led by Clyde Drexler. The Pistons won Game 1 at home, 105–99, but lost Game 2 in overtime, 106–105 as the Blazers tied the series at one game a piece, the Pistons defeated the Blazers in five hard-fought games to win their second consecutive NBA championship. Thomas was named NBA Finals MVP. The Pistons would not reach the NBA Finals again until 2004, in which they won the Finals in five games against their heavily favored rivals, the Los Angeles Lakers to win their third NBA championship.

Draft picks

Roster

Regular season

Season standings

Record vs. opponents

Game log

Playoffs

|- align="center" bgcolor="#ccffcc"
| 1
| April 26
| Indiana
| W 104–92
| James Edwards (21)
| Bill Laimbeer (14)
| Thomas, Dumars (5)
| The Palace of Auburn Hills21,454
| 1–0
|- align="center" bgcolor="#ccffcc"
| 2
| April 28
| Indiana
| W 100–87
| Bill Laimbeer (22)
| Bill Laimbeer (11)
| Isiah Thomas (12)
| The Palace of Auburn Hills21,454
| 2–0
|- align="center" bgcolor="#ccffcc"
| 3
| May 1
| @ Indiana
| W 108–96
| Isiah Thomas (23)
| Bill Laimbeer (19)
| Isiah Thomas (9)
| Market Square Arena15,301
| 3–0
|-

|- align="center" bgcolor="#ccffcc"
| 1
| May 8
| New York
| W 112–77
| Isiah Thomas (21)
| Bill Laimbeer (13)
| Isiah Thomas (7)
| The Palace of Auburn Hills21,454
| 1–0
|- align="center" bgcolor="#ccffcc"
| 2
| May 10
| New York
| W 104–97
| James Edwards (32)
| Bill Laimbeer (13)
| Isiah Thomas (12)
| The Palace of Auburn Hills21,454
| 2–0
|- align="center" bgcolor="#ffcccc"
| 3
| May 12
| @ New York
| L 103–111
| Isiah Thomas (20)
| Dennis Rodman (8)
| Isiah Thomas (6)
| Madison Square Garden18,212
| 2–1
|- align="center" bgcolor="#ccffcc"
| 4
| May 13
| @ New York
| W 102–90
| James Edwards (19)
| Dennis Rodman (14)
| Isiah Thomas (11)
| Madison Square Garden18,212
| 3–1
|- align="center" bgcolor="#ccffcc"
| 5
| May 15
| New York
| W 95–84
| Mark Aguirre (25)
| Dennis Rodman (11)
| Isiah Thomas (6)
| The Palace of Auburn Hills21,454
| 4–1
|-

|- align="center" bgcolor="#ccffcc"
| 1
| May 20
| Chicago
| W 86–77
| Joe Dumars (27)
| Dennis Rodman (13)
| Isiah Thomas (6)
| The Palace of Auburn Hills21,454
| 1–0
|- align="center" bgcolor="#ccffcc"
| 2
| May 22
| Chicago
| W 102–93
| Joe Dumars (31)
| Laimbeer, Johnson (8)
| Thomas, Johnson (7)
| The Palace of Auburn Hills21,454
| 2–0
|- align="center" bgcolor="#ffcccc"
| 3
| May 26
| @ Chicago
| L 102–107
| Isiah Thomas (36)
| Bill Laimbeer (8)
| Isiah Thomas (8)
| Chicago Stadium18,676
| 2–1
|- align="center" bgcolor="#ffcccc"
| 4
| May 28
| @ Chicago
| L 101–108
| Isiah Thomas (26)
| Dennis Rodman (20)
| Isiah Thomas (8)
| Chicago Stadium18,676
| 2–2
|- align="center" bgcolor="#ccffcc"
| 5
| May 30
| Chicago
| W 97–83
| Joe Dumars (20)
| John Salley (10)
| Isiah Thomas (10)
| The Palace of Auburn Hills21,454
| 3–2
|- align="center" bgcolor="#ffcccc"
| 6
| June 1
| @ Chicago
| L 91–109
| Joe Dumars (23)
| Rodman, Laimbeer (8)
| Isiah Thomas (10)
| Chicago Stadium18,676
| 3–3
|- align="center" bgcolor="#ccffcc"
| 7
| June 3
| Chicago
| W 93–74
| Isiah Thomas (21)
| Mark Aguirre (10)
| Isiah Thomas (11)
| The Palace of Auburn Hills21,454
| 4–3
|-

|- align="center" bgcolor="#ccffcc"
| 1
| June 5
| Portland
| W 105–99
| Isiah Thomas (33)
| Bill Laimbeer (15)
| Isiah Thomas (6)
| The Palace at Auburn Hills21,454
| 1–0
|- align="center" bgcolor="#ffcccc"
| 2
| June 7
| Portland
| L 105–106 (OT)
| Edwards, Laimbeer (26)
| Bill Laimbeer (11)
| Isiah Thomas (11)
| The Palace at Auburn Hills21,454
| 1–1
|- align="center" bgcolor="#ccffcc"
| 3
| June 10
| @ Portland
| W 121–106
| Joe Dumars (33)
| Bill Laimbeer (12)
| Isiah Thomas (8)
| Memorial Coliseum12,884
| 2–1
|- align="center" bgcolor="#ccffcc"
| 4
| June 12
| @ Portland
| W 112–109
| Isiah Thomas (32)
| Bill Laimbeer (12)
| Isiah Thomas (5)
| Memorial Coliseum12,642
| 3–1
|- align="center" bgcolor="#ccffcc"
| 5
| June 14
| @ Portland
| W 92–90
| Isiah Thomas (29)
| Bill Laimbeer (17)
| Joe Dumars (7)
| Memorial Coliseum12,642
| 4–1
|-

Player statistics

Season

Playoffs

Awards and records
Isiah Thomas, NBA Finals Most Valuable Player Award
Dennis Rodman, NBA Defensive Player of the Year Award
Joe Dumars, All-NBA Third Team
Joe Dumars, NBA All-Defensive First Team
Dennis Rodman, NBA All-Defensive First Team

References

External links
 Detroit Pistons on Database Basketball
 Detroit Pistons on Basketball Reference

Det
Detroit Pistons seasons
Eastern Conference (NBA) championship seasons
NBA championship seasons
1989 in sports in Michigan
Detroit